The 2021–22 Chicago Bulls season was the 56th season of the franchise in the National Basketball Association (NBA). The Bulls had not made the playoffs since the 2016–17 season, but on April 5, 2022, following the loss of the Cleveland Cavaliers to the Orlando Magic, the Bulls clinched a playoff berth, ending their five-year playoff drought. The Bulls fell to the defending NBA champion Milwaukee Bucks in the first round in five games.

Draft picks 

The Bulls had a single pick in the draft.

Standings

Division

Conference

Roster

Game log

Preseason

|- style="background:#cfc;"
| 1
| October 5
| Cleveland
| 
| Zach LaVine (25)
| Alize Johnson (11)
| Alex Caruso (10)
| United Center11,777
| 1–0
|- style="background:#cfc;"
| 2
| October 8
| New Orleans
| 
| Zach LaVine (21)
| Nikola Vučević (10)
| Caruso, Johnson (5)
| United Center13,909
| 2–0
|- style="background:#cfc;"
| 3
| October 10
| @ Cleveland
| 
| DeMar DeRozan (23)
| Alize Johnson (11)
| Alex Caruso (4)
| Rocket Mortgage FieldHouse10,003
| 3–0
|- style="background:#cfc;"
| 4
| October 15
| Memphis
| 
| Zach LaVine (31)
| Nikola Vučević (8)
| Ball, LaVine (6)
| United Center14,412
| 4–0

Regular season 

|- style="background:#cfc;"
| 1
| October 20
| @ Detroit
| 
| Zach LaVine (34)
| Nikola Vučević (15)
| Ball, LaVine, Vučević (4)
| Little Caesars Arena20,088
| 1–0
|- style="background:#cfc;"
| 2
| October 22
| New Orleans
| 
| Zach LaVine (32)
| Lonzo Ball (10)
| Lonzo Ball (10)
| United Center20,995
| 2–0
|- style="background:#cfc;"
| 3
| October 23
| Detroit
| 
| DeMar DeRozan (21)
| Nikola Vučević (19)
| DeMar DeRozan (6)
| United Center18,888
| 3–0
|- style="background:#cfc;" 
| 4
| October 25
| @ Toronto
| 
| DeMar DeRozan (26)
| Nikola Vučević (8)
| DeMar DeRozan (6)
| Scotiabank Arena19,800
| 4–0
|- style="background:#fcc;"
| 5
| October 28
| New York
| 
| Zach LaVine (25)
| Nikola Vučević (8)
| Caruso, Vučević (6)
| United Center20,972
| 4–1
|- style="background:#cfc;"
| 6
| October 30
| Utah
| 
| DeMar DeRozan (32)
| Nikola Vučević (12)
| Zach LaVine (5)
| United Center20,668
| 5–1

|- style="background:#cfc;"
| 7
| November 1
| @ Boston
| 
| DeMar DeRozan (37)
| Nikola Vučević (10)
| Nikola Vučević (9)
| TD Garden19,156
| 6–1
|- style="background:#fcc;"
| 8
| November 3
| @ Philadelphia
| 
| DeMar DeRozan (37)
| DeRozan, Vučević (10)
| Caruso, Vučević (6)
| Wells Fargo Center20,438
| 6–2
|- style="background:#fcc;"
| 9
| November 6
| Philadelphia
| 
| Zach LaVine (32)
| Nikola Vučević (11)
| Lonzo Ball (5)
| United Center20,936
| 6–3
|- style="background:#cfc;"
| 10
| November 8
| Brooklyn
| 
| DeMar DeRozan (28)
| Nikola Vučević (13)
| LaVine, Vučević (5)
| United Center19,459
| 7–3
|- style="background:#cfc;"
| 11
| November 10
| Dallas
| 
| Zach LaVine (23)
| Nikola Vučević (10)
| Ball, DeRozan (6)
| United Center20,910
| 8–3
|- style="background:#fcc;"
| 12
| November 12
| @ Golden State
| 
| Zach LaVine (23)
| Alize Johnson (7)
| Caruso, DeRozan (5)
| Chase Center18,064
| 8–4
|- style="background:#cfc;"
| 13
| November 14
| @ LA Clippers
| 
| DeMar DeRozan (35)
| Alex Caruso (9)
| Caruso, DeRozan (5)
| Staples Center17,899
| 9–4
|- style="background:#cfc;"
| 14
| November 15
| @ LA Lakers
| 
| DeMar DeRozan (38)
| Tony Bradley (9)
| Lonzo Ball (8)
| Staples Center18,997
| 10–4
|- style="background:#fcc;"
| 15
| November 17
| @ Portland
| 
| Zach LaVine (30)
| Alex Caruso (10)
| Alex Caruso (9)
| Moda Center17,492
| 10–5
|- style="background:#cfc;"
| 16
| November 19
| @ Denver
| 
| Zach LaVine (36)
| Javonte Green (9)
| Lonzo Ball (6)
| Ball Arena19,520
| 11–5
|- style="background:#cfc;"
| 17
| November 21
| New York
| 
| DeMar DeRozan (31)
| Javonte Green (9)
| Ball, DeRozan (5)
| United Center21,813
| 12–5
|- style="background:#fcc;"
| 18
| November 22
| Indiana
| 
| DeMar DeRozan (18)
| Ball, Bradley, Brown Jr., Jones Jr., White (5)
| LaVine, White (3)
| United Center21,586
| 12–6
|- style="background:#fcc;"
| 19
| November 24
| @ Houston
| 
| Zach LaVine (28)
| Nikola Vučević (13)
| DeMar DeRozan (7)
| Toyota Center16,074
| 12–7
|- style="background:#cfc;"
| 20
| November 26
| @ Orlando
| 
| DeMar DeRozan (23)
| Green, Vučević (8)
| Lonzo Ball (6)
| Amway Center18,236
| 13–7
|- style="background:#fcc;"
| 21
| November 27
| Miami
| 
| DeMar DeRozan (28)
| Nikola Vučević (13)
| Ball, Caruso (6)
| United Center21,110
| 13–8
|- style="background:#cfc;"
| 22
| November 29
| Charlotte
| 
| Nikola Vučević (30)
| Nikola Vučević (14)
| Lonzo Ball (8)
| United Center21,366
| 14–8
  
|- style="background:#cfc;"
| 23
| December 2
| @ New York
| 
| DeMar DeRozan (34)
| LaVine, Vučević (7)
| Ball, Caruso (6)
| Madison Square Garden19,812
| 15–8
|- style="background:#cfc;"
| 24
| December 4
| @ Brooklyn
| 
| Zach LaVine (31)
| Lonzo Ball (9)
| Lonzo Ball (7)
| Barclays Center18,116
| 16–8
|- style="background:#cfc;"
| 25
| December 6
| Denver
| 
| Zach LaVine (32)
| Ball, Vučević (10)
| Dosunmu, LaVine (8)
| United Center21,236
| 17–8
|-style="background:#fcc;"
| 26
| December 8
| @ Cleveland
| 
| Zach LaVine (23)
| Nikola Vučević (12)
| Zach LaVine (9)
| Rocket Mortgage FieldHouse17,707
| 17–9
|- style="background:#fcc;"
| 27
| December 11
| @ Miami
| 
| Zach LaVine (33)
| Nikola Vučević (8)
| Alex Caruso (5)
| FTX Arena19,731
| 17–10
|-style="background:#ccc;"
| PPD
| December 14
| Detroit
| colspan="6" | Postponed (COVID-19) (Makeup date: January 11)
|-style="background:#ccc;"
| PPD
| December 16
| @ Toronto
| colspan="6" | Postponed (COVID-19) (Makeup date: February 3)
|- style="background:#cfc;"
| 28
| December 19
| LA Lakers
| 
| DeMar DeRozan (38)
| Nikola Vučević (13)
| DeMar DeRozan (6)
| United Center21,560
| 18–10
|- style="background:#cfc;"
| 29
| December 20
| Houston
| 
| DeMar DeRozan (26)
| Nikola Vučević (6)
| Lonzo Ball (8)
| United Center21,150
| 19–10
|-style="background:#ccc;"
| PPD
| December 22
| Toronto
| colspan="6" | Postponed (COVID-19) (Makeup date: January 26)
|- style="background:#cfc;"
| 30
| December 26
| Indiana
| 
| Zach LaVine (32)
| Nikola Vučević (15)
| Zach LaVine (5)
| United Center20,475
| 20–10
|- style="background:#cfc;"
| 31
| December 27
| @ Atlanta
| 
| DeMar DeRozan (35)
| Nikola Vučević (17)
| DeMar DeRozan (10)
| State Farm Arena17,049
| 21–10
|- style="background:#cfc;"
| 32
| December 29
| Atlanta
| 
| Zach LaVine (25)
| Nikola Vučević (20)
| Coby White (12)
| United Center21,372
| 22–10
|- style="background:#cfc;"
| 33
| December 31
| @ Indiana
| 
| DeMar DeRozan (28)
| Nikola Vučević (16)
| DeMar DeRozan (6)
| Gainbridge Fieldhouse17,515
| 23–10

|- style="background:#cfc;"
| 34
| January 1
| @ Washington
| 
| Zach LaVine (35)
| Nikola Vučević (12)
| DeRozan, White (5)
| Capital One Arena19,043
| 24–10
|- style="background:#cfc;"
| 35
| January 3
| Orlando
| 
| DeMar DeRozan (29)
| Nikola Vučević (17)
| Lonzo Ball (7)
| United Center20,502
| 25–10
|- style="background:#cfc;"
| 36
| January 7
| Washington
| 
| Zach LaVine (27)
| Nikola Vučević (14)
| DeMar DeRozan (8)
| United Center21,700
| 26–10
|- style="background:#fcc;"
| 37
| January 9
| @ Dallas
| 
| DeRozan, LaVine (20)
| Derrick Jones Jr. (8)
| DeMar DeRozan (8)
| American Airlines Center20,041
| 26–11
|- style="background:#cfc;"
| 38
| January 11
| Detroit
| 
| Nikola Vučević (22)
| DeMar DeRozan (12)
| DeRozan, LaVine (7)
| United Center19,886
| 27–11
|- style="background:#fcc;"
| 39
| January 12
| Brooklyn
| 
| Zach LaVine (22)
| Lonzo Ball (7)
| Lonzo Ball (7)
| United Center21,698
| 27–12
|- style="background:#fcc;"
| 40
| January 14
| Golden State
| 
| Coby White (20)
| Nikola Vučević (14)
| DeMar DeRozan (7)
| United Center21,174
| 27–13
|- style="background:#fcc;"
| 41
| January 15
| @ Boston
| 
| Nikola Vučević (27)
| DeMar DeRozan (8)
| Ayo Dosunmu (10)
| TD Garden19,156
| 27–14
|- style="background:#fcc;"
| 42
| January 17
| @ Memphis
| 
| DeMar DeRozan (24)
| Dosunmu, Vučević (10)
| Ayo Dosunmu (6)
| FedExForum17,794
| 27–15
|- style="background:#cfc;"
| 43
| January 19
| Cleveland
| 
| DeMar DeRozan (30)
| Nikola Vučević (12)
| Ayo Dosunmu (8)
| United Center20,824
| 28–15
|- style="background:#fcc;"
| 44
| January 21
| @ Milwaukee
| 
| DeMar DeRozan (35)
| Nikola Vučević (11)
| Ayo Dosunmu (6)
| Fiserv Forum18,013
| 28–16
|- style="background:#fcc;"
| 45
| January 23
| @ Orlando
| 
| DeMar DeRozan (41)
| Nikola Vučević (13)
| DeRozan, Vučević (3)
| Amway Center18,846
| 28–17
|- style="background:#cfc;"
| 46
| January 24
| @ Oklahoma City
| 
| Nikola Vučević (26)
| Nikola Vučević (15)
| Ayo Dosunmu (8)
| Paycom Center14,378
| 29–17
|- style="background:#cfc;"
| 47
| January 26
| Toronto
| 
| DeMar DeRozan (29)
| Nikola Vučević (15)
| LaVine, Vučević (8)
| United Center20,269
| 30–17
|- style="background:#fcc;"
| 48
| January 28
| @ San Antonio
| 
| DeMar DeRozan (32)
| Nikola Vučević (8)
| DeMar DeRozan (8)
| AT&T Center18,354
| 30–18
|- style="background:#cfc;"
| 49
| January 30
| Portland
| 
| Nikola Vučević (24)
| Nikola Vučević (14)
| Ayo Dosunmu (11)
| United Center19,521 
| 31–18

|- style="background:#cfc;"
| 50
| February 1
| Orlando
| 
| DeMar DeRozan (29)
| Nikola Vučević (13)
| Ayo Dosunmu (9)
| United Center20,217
| 32–18
|- style="background:#fcc;"
| 51
| February 3
| @ Toronto
| 
| Nikola Vučević (30)
| Nikola Vučević (18)
| Ayo Dosunmu (8)
| Scotiabank Arena0
| 32–19
|- style="background:#cfc;"
| 52
| February 4
| @ Indiana
| 
| Nikola Vučević (36)
| Nikola Vučević (17)
| Ayo Dosunmu (14)
| Gainbridge Fieldhouse16,355
| 33–19
|- style="background:#fcc;" 
| 53
| February 6
| Philadelphia
| 
| DeMar DeRozan (45)
| DeMar DeRozan (9)
| DeRozan, Dosunmu (7)
| United Center20,233
| 33–20
|- style="background:#fcc;"
| 54
| February 7
| Phoenix
| 
| DeMar DeRozan (38)
| Nikola Vučević (12)
| Zach LaVine (8)
| United Center20,615
| 33–21
|- style="background:#cfc;"
| 55
| February 9
| @ Charlotte
| 
| DeMar DeRozan (36)
| Nikola Vučević (15)
| Nikola Vučević (8)
| Spectrum Center19,099
| 34–21
|- style="background:#cfc;"
| 56
| February 11
| Minnesota
| 
| DeMar DeRozan (35)
| Nikola Vučević (8)
| Ayo Dosunmu (10)
| United Center20,092
| 35–21
|- style="background:#cfc;"
| 57
| February 12
| Oklahoma City
| 
| DeMar DeRozan (38)
| Nikola Vučević (15)
| Ayo Dosunmu (9)
| United Center20,072
| 36–21
|- style="background:#cfc;"
| 58
| February 14
| San Antonio
| 
| DeMar DeRozan (40)
| Nikola Vučević (16)
| DeMar DeRozan (7)
| United Center21,153
| 37–21
|- style="background:#cfc;"
| 59
| February 16
| Sacramento
| 
| DeMar DeRozan (38)
| Nikola Vučević (10)
| DeRozan, Dosunmu, White (6)
| United Center19,166
| 38–21
|- style="background:#cfc;"
| 60
| February 24
| Atlanta
| 
| DeMar DeRozan (37)
| Nikola Vučević (10) 
| DeRozan, Dosunmu, LaVine, Vučević (3)
| United Center21,236
| 39–21
|-style="background:#fcc;"
| 61
| February 26
| Memphis
| 
| DeMar DeRozan (31)
| Nikola Vučević (12)
| Zach Lavine (6)
| United Center21,959
| 39-22
|- style="background:#fcc;"
| 62
| February 28
| @ Miami
| 
| Zach LaVine (22)
| DeRozan, Vučević (7)
| Dosunmu, White (6)
| FTX Arena19,683
| 39–23

|- style="background:#fcc;"
| 63
| March 3
| @ Atlanta
| 
| DeRozan, LaVine (22)
| Nikola Vučević (11)
| DeMar DeRozan (8)
| State Farm Arena17,522
| 39–24
|- style="background:#fcc;"
| 64
| March 4
| Milwaukee
| 
| Zach LaVine (30)
| Nikola Vučević (9)
| Ayo Dosunmu (7)
| United Center21,259
| 39–25
|- style="background:#fcc;"
| 65
| March 7
| @ Philadelphia
| 
| Zach LaVine (24)
| DeMar DeRozan (11)
| DeMar DeRozan (8)
| Wells Fargo Center20,381
| 39–26
|- style="background:#cfc;"
| 66
| March 9
| @ Detroit
| 
| DeMar DeRozan (36)
| DeMar DeRozan (8)
| Ayo Dosunmu (7)
| Little Caesars Arena18,022
| 40–26
|- style="background:#cfc;"
| 67
| March 12
| Cleveland
| 
| DeMar DeRozan (25)
| Nikola Vučević (14)  
| Coby White (7)
| United Center21,727 
| 41–26
|- style="background:#fcc;"
| 68
| March 14
| @ Sacramento
| 
| Zach LaVine (27)
| Nikola Vučević (10)
| DeRozan, LaVine (6)
| Golden 1 Center15,943
| 41–27
|- style="background:#fcc;"
| 69
| March 16
| @ Utah
| 
| Zach LaVine (33)
| Nikola Vučević (11)
| DeMar DeRozan (7)
| Vivint Arena18,306
| 41–28
|- style="background:#fcc;"
| 70
| March 18
| @ Phoenix
| 
| DeMar DeRozan (19)
| Green, Vučević (7)
| Zach LaVine (9)
| Footprint Center17,071
| 41–29
|- style="background:#cfc;"
| 71
| March 21
| Toronto
| 
| DeRozan, LaVine (26)
| Nikola Vučević (13)
| Caruso, Dosunmu, LaVine (6)
| United Center21,778
| 42–29
|- style="background:#fcc;"
| 72
| March 22
| @ Milwaukee
| 
| Nikola Vučević (22)
| Nikola Vučević (7)
| Zach LaVine (7)
| Fiserv Forum17,983
| 42–30
|- style="background:#fcc;"
| 73
| March 24
| @ New Orleans
| 
| Zach LaVine (39)
| Nikola Vučević (9)
| Coby White (6)
| Smoothie King Center13,973
| 42–31
|- style="background:#cfc;"
| 74
| March 26
| @ Cleveland
| 
| Zach LaVine (25)
| Nikola Vučević (9)
| Alex Caruso (7)
| Rocket Mortgage FieldHouse19,432
| 43–31
|- style="background:#fcc;"
| 75
| March 28
| @ New York
| 
| DeMar DeRozan (37)
| Nikola Vučević (13)
| DeMar DeRozan (7)
| Madison Square Garden19,812
| 43–32
|- style="background:#cfc;"
| 76
| March 29
| @ Washington
| 
| DeMar DeRozan (32)
| DeRozan, Williams (7)
| Ayo Dosunmu (6)
| Capital One Arena15,922
| 44–32
|- style="background:#cfc;"
| 77
| March 31
| LA Clippers
| 
| DeMar DeRozan (50)
| Nikola Vučević (14)
| Alex Caruso (7)
| United Center21,519
| 45–32

|- style="background:#fcc;"
| 78
| April 2
| Miami
| 
| Zach LaVine (33)
| Nikola Vučević (10)
| Nikola Vučević (5)
| United Center21,697
| 45–33
|- style="background:#fcc;"
| 79
| April 5
| Milwaukee
| 
| DeMar DeRozan (40)
| Tristan Thompson (7)
| Alex Caruso (8)
| United Center20,799
| 45–34
|- style="background:#fcc;"
| 80
| April 6
| Boston
| 
| DeMar DeRozan (16)
| Nikola Vučević (7)
| DeMar DeRozan (5)
| United Center21,095
| 45–35
|- style="background:#fcc;"
| 81
| April 8
| Charlotte
| 
| Zach LaVine (23)
| Brown Jr., Vučević (5)
| Zach LaVine (7)
| United Center21,461
| 45–36
|- style="background:#cfc;"
| 82
| April 10
| @ Minnesota
| 
| Patrick Williams (35)
| Troy Brown Jr. (11)
| Ayo Dosunmu (6)
| Target Center17,136
| 46–36
|-

Playoffs

|- style="background:#fcc;"
| 1
| April 17
| @ Milwaukee
| 
| Nikola Vučević (24)
| Nikola Vučević (17)
| DeMar DeRozan (6)
| Fiserv Forum17,717
| 0–1
|- style="background:#cfc;"
| 2
| April 20
| @ Milwaukee
| 
| DeMar DeRozan (41)
| Nikola Vučević (13)
| Alex Caruso (10)
| Fiserv Forum17,688
| 1–1
|-style="background:#fcc;"
| 3
| April 22
| Milwaukee
| 
| Nikola Vučević (19)
| Coby White (8)
| Dosunmu, LaVine (5)
| United Center22,667
| 1–2
|-style="background:#fcc;"
| 4
| April 24
| Milwaukee
| 
| Zach LaVine (24)
| Vučević, Williams (10)
| Zach LaVine (13)
| United Center22,020
| 1–3
|-style="background:#fcc;"
| 5
| April 27
| @ Milwaukee
| 
| Patrick Williams (23)
| Nikola Vučević (16)
| DeMar DeRozan (7)
| Fiserv Forum17,506
| 1–4

Player statistics

|-
| align="left"| || align="center"| PG
| 35 || 35 || 1,212 || 190 || 178 || 64 || 31 || 455
|-
| align="left"|≠ || align="center"| C
| 1 || 0 || 2 || 1 || 0 || 1 || 0 || 0
|-
| align="left"| || align="center"| C
| 55 || 7 || 549 || 186 || 27 || 10 || 33 || 163
|-
| align="left"| || align="center"| SF
| 66 || 7 || 1,055 || 203 || 66 || 36 || 5 || 283
|-
| align="left"| || align="center"| PG
| 41 || 18 || 1,147 || 148 || 165 || style=";"|71 || 15 || 304
|-
| align="left"| || align="center"| PF
| 20 || 2 || 200 || 53 || 3 || 4 || 4 || 67
|-
| align="left"| || align="center"| SF
| 76 || style=";"|76 || style=";"|2,743 || 392 || style=";"|374 || 68 || 24 || style=";"|2,118
|-
| align="left"| || align="center"| G
| style=";"|77 || 40 || 2,110 || 214 || 256 || 60 || 29 || 679
|-
| align="left"|‡ || align="center"| PG
| 11 || 0 || 85 || 9 || 15 || 1 || 0 || 29
|-
| align="left"| || align="center"| SG/PG
| 65 || 45 || 1,519 || 276 || 60 || 67 || 32 || 468
|-
| align="left"|≠ || align="center"| SG/SF
| 16 || 0 || 166 || 29 || 7 || 3 || 2 || 55
|-
| align="left"|‡ || align="center"| PF
| 16 || 0 || 121 || 36 || 8 || 3 || 0 || 28
|-
| align="left"| || align="center"| SF
| 51 || 8 || 899 || 169 || 30 || 25 || 33 || 286
|-
| align="left"| || align="center"| SG
| 67 || 67 || 2,328 || 308 || 303 || 41 || 23 || 1,635
|-
| align="left"|≠ || align="center"| SG
| 1 || 0 || 3 || 0 || 0 || 0 || 0 || 2
|-
| align="left"|≠ || align="center"| SF
| 17 || 3 || 206 || 33 || 5 || 2 || 3 || 59
|-
| align="left"| || align="center"| C
| 9 || 0 || 35 || 10 || 0 || 1 || 1 || 17
|-
| align="left"| || align="center"| SG
| 40 || 0 || 459 || 50 || 20 || 8 || 3 || 161
|-
| align="left"|≠ || align="center"| C
| 23 || 3 || 376 || 109 || 14 || 12 || 7 || 130
|-
| align="left"| || align="center"| C
| 73 || 73 || 2,418 || style=";"|804 || 236 || 70 || style=";"|71 || 1,288
|-
| align="left"| || align="center"| PG
| 61 || 17 || 1,675 || 182 || 176 || 29 || 11 || 772
|-
| align="left"| || align="center"| PF
| 17 || 9 || 422 || 69 || 15 || 9 || 9 || 153
|}
After all games.
‡Waived during the season
†Traded during the season
≠Acquired during the season

References

2020-21
Chicago Bulls
2021 in sports in Illinois
2022 in sports in Illinois
2020s in Chicago
Bulls
Bulls